Hothouse is an unincorporated community in Cherokee County, in the U.S. state of North Carolina.

History
A post office called Hothouse was established in 1877, and remained in operation until 1907. The area was named for its numerous former Cherokee sweat lodges.

References

Unincorporated communities in North Carolina
Unincorporated communities in Cherokee County, North Carolina